Luis Borja Lázaro Fernández (born 5 April 1988) is a Spanish footballer who plays as a striker for Algeciras CF.

Football career
Born in Madrid, Lázaro finished his graduation with Scottish club Rangers F.C.'s youth setup. He moved to Sporting de Gijón in the 2008 summer, being immediately assigned to the reserves in Segunda División B.

In August 2010 Lázaro joined Pontevedra CF, also in the third level. However, after appearing sparingly for the Galicians he moved to Tercera División's CD Puerta Bonita, and later to SD Noja.

On 21 July 2012 Lázaro moved to Ontinyent CF. He continued to appear in the third and fourth levels in the following years, representing UB Conquense and UD Almería B.

On 1 July 2014 Lázaro joined CD Leganés, newly promoted to Segunda División. He played his first match as a professional on 24 August, replacing Carlos Álvarez in the 74th minute of a 1–1 home draw against Deportivo Alavés.

Lázaro scored his first professional goals on 7 September 2014, netting a hat-trick in a 3–1 home win against RCD Mallorca. He contributed with seven goals in 26 appearances during the 2015–16 campaign, as Lega achieved promotion to La Liga for the first time ever.

On 16 June 2016, Lázaro signed a three-year deal with SD Huesca also in the second tier. On 6 July of the following year, he agreed to a two-year contract with fellow league team AD Alcorcón.

On 19 January 2018, Lázaro was loaned to Racing de Santander until June. Upon returning, he terminated his contract on 12 July, and signed for CF Fuenlabrada on 1 August.

Lázro contributed with four goals during the season, helping Fuenla in their first-ever promotion to the second division. On 18 December 2019, he cut ties with the club, and signed for Algeciras CF in division three the following 29 January.

References

External links

1988 births
Living people
Footballers from Madrid
Spanish footballers
Association football forwards
Segunda División players
Segunda División B players
Sporting de Gijón B players
Pontevedra CF footballers
Ontinyent CF players
UB Conquense footballers
UD Almería B players
CD Leganés players
SD Huesca footballers
AD Alcorcón footballers
Racing de Santander players
CF Fuenlabrada footballers
Algeciras CF footballers